Subergorgiidae is a family of corals, a member of the phylum Cnidaria.

Genera
Genera in this family include:
 Annella Gray, 1858
 Rosgorgia Lopez Gonzalez & Gili, 2001
 Subergorgia Gray, 1857

References

 
Scleraxonia
Cnidarian families